The 2019 CONMEBOL qualifiers for the FIFA Beach Soccer World Cup, (natively in Spanish: CONMEBOL Eliminatorias al Mundial de la FIFA de Fútbol Playa Brasil 2019) was the eighth edition of the Beach Soccer World Cup qualification championship contested by the men's national teams of South America to determine the best beach soccer nation on the continent, organised by CONMEBOL. The tournament acted as a qualifying event to the 2019 FIFA Beach Soccer World Cup in Asunción, Paraguay, with the top two finishing nations progressing to the finals in addition to Paraguay who qualify automatically as hosts.

The competition took place from 28 April to 5 May 2019 in Rio de Janeiro, Brazil. Brazil were the defending champions and winners.

Participating teams
All ten CONMEBOL member national teams entered the tournament.

 (hosts and title holders)

Draw
The draw of the tournament was held on 10 April 2019 in Rio de Janeiro, Brazil during the 70th CONMEBOL Ordinary Congress. The ten teams were drawn into two groups of five. The hosts and defending champions Brazil and the 2017 vice-champions Paraguay were seeded into Group A and Group B respectively and assigned to position 1 in their group, while the remaining eight teams were placed into four "pairing pots" according to their final positions in the 2017 CONMEBOL qualifiers for the FIFA Beach Soccer World Cup (shown in brackets).

Group stage
Each team earns three points for a win in regulation time, two points for a win in extra time, one point for a win in a penalty shoot-out, and no points for a defeat. The top two teams from each group advance to the semi-finals, while the teams in third, fourth and fifth advance to the fifth place, seventh place, and ninth place matches respectively.

All times are local, BRT (UTC−3).

Group A

Group B

Placement stage (5th–10th place)

Bracket (5th–10th place)

Ninth place match

Seventh place match

Fifth place match

Knockout stage

Bracket (1st–4th place)

Semi-finals
Winners qualify for 2019 FIFA Beach Soccer World Cup.

Third place match

Final

Final ranking

Qualified teams for FIFA Beach Soccer World Cup
The following three teams from CONMEBOL qualify for the 2019 FIFA Beach Soccer World Cup, including Paraguay who qualified automatically as host.

1 Bold indicates champions for that year. Italic indicates hosts for that year.

References

External links
Eliminatorias Mundial futbol de playa, CONMEBOL.com
CONMEBOL Eliminatorias Mundial FIFA Fútbol Playa Brasil 2019 , at Beach Soccer Worldwide

CONMEBOL
2019
2019 in beach soccer
2019 in South American football
2019 in Brazilian football
Beach soccer in Brazil
International association football competitions hosted by Brazil
April 2019 sports events in South America
May 2019 sports events in South America